Albert Parsis (2 June 1890 – 24 February 1980) was a French footballer. He competed in the men's tournament at the 1920 Summer Olympics.

References

External links
 

1890 births
1980 deaths
French footballers
France international footballers
Olympic footballers of France
Footballers at the 1920 Summer Olympics
Sportspeople from Tourcoing
Association football goalkeepers
Footballers from Hauts-de-France
US Tourcoing FC players